The Symphony en la mineur, op. 24 by Louis Vierne is the composer's second symphonic score, after  op. 22, and is the only symphony for orchestra by the blind organist of Notre-Dame de Paris who composed six Organ Symphonies.

Composed in 1907 and 1908, a contemporary of Vierne's , Op. 23, the Symphony is marked by the circumstances of its composition, in this case his troubled family life and strained relations with his wife, which led to a divorce in 1909. The first performance of the work took place on 26 January 1919 at the Salle Gaveau conducted by Gabriel Pierné. The score, still unpublished, is now in the public domain.

Composition 
Vierne composed his Symphony during the summers of 1907 and 1908, spent in Juziers. The composition of a work for orchestra, between organ symphonies, is a particularly hard physical ordeal for the musician: 

If his sight, "weakened but appreciable nevertheless, had allowed him to write his compositions with a pen and to have recourse to a third party only for the work of copying or orchestration, which would have fatigued him too much", it is always in the glow of a bec Auer (so close and a fire so intense that he confided to one of his friends that "the litters would end up becoming bloody".

The circumstances of the composition are also marked by the composer's marital problems:

Premiere 
The score is immediately proposed for study, in its version for piano four hands: 

The first performance of the work was not to take place until 26 January 1919 in the Salle Gaveau (in the composer's absence, still convalescent in Savoy) under the direction of Gabriel Pierné, and not Camille Chevillard as Bernard Gavoty mentions. Adolphe Boschot, (surprised by the work's romanticism), wonders about its date of composition in an article in L'Écho de Paris dated 27 January: 

The work, dedicated to Gabriel Fauré, has never been published: the manuscript preserved at the Bibliothèque Nationale de France under the title "Vma-Ms. 645", is now in the public domain.

Introduction

Setting 
The orchestra consists of 3 flutes (the 3rd also playing the piccolo), 2 oboes, 1 English horn, 2 clarinets in A, 1 bass clarinet in A, 2 bassoons and contrabassoon, for the lecterns of the Wind instrument. The brass instruments consist of 4 horns in F, 4 trumpets in C, 2 tenor trombones and two bass trombones. Percussion is limited to timpani but requires two timpanists. The classical string quintet consists of the first violins, second violins, alto, cello and double bass.

The orchestration of the "Symphony" is remarkable for its "dark colours", with the rare presence of two bass trombones instead of the tuba associated with a bass trombone.

Mouvements 
The "Symphony" op. 24 is in two large "parts" or four movements:
 Grave in A minor in four beats – Allegro molto in  – enchaîné.
 Lamento – Adagio molto in F sharp minor to 
 Scherzo – Animato ma non troppo in D minor to  – chained.
 Finale – Allegro moderato in a major two-beat .

Analysis 
The Lamento, "whose character is more than melancholy, bears as its epigraph verses from Verlaine which Vierne later used for one of the melodies of ":
        Un grand sommeil noir 
        Tombe sur ma vie ;
        Dormez, tout espoir,
        Dormez, toute envie…

For Gavoty, "this suggestive Lamento, like everything else in Vierne's work that springs from the heart, is the most original part of the symphony, the other three movements (Grave and Allegro molto, Scherzo and Finale) being, in spite of their masterful craftsmanship, of a more traditional cut".

Legacy 
From its late premiere, this symphony was considered a little timid.  Gavoty, however, considers it to be

Recording 
 Louis Vierne : Symphonie en la mineur op. 24,  op. 50, by the Orchestre Philharmonique de Liège, directed by Pierre Bartholomée (1996, CD Timpani 1C1036)

Further reading

References

Cited sources 
 
 

Compositions by Louis Vierne
Vierne
1908 compositions
Compositions in A minor